After Hours is the fifth and final solo studio album by Glenn Frey, released in 2012 (see 2012 in music), four years before his death. The album is very different from Frey's previous rock albums and features material from the Great American Songbook and songs in the same mood by Brian Wilson or Randy Newman. The album charted at number 116 in the U.S. and number 92 in the UK. After Hours was Frey's first new studio solo album in 20 years since 1992's Strange Weather, which was a commercial disappointment.

Track listing
 "For Sentimental Reasons" (William "Pat" Best, Deek Watson) – 3:03
 "My Buddy" (Walter Donaldson, Gus Kahn) – 3:45
 "The Good Life" (Sacha Distel, Jack Reardon) – 2:25 (Deluxe Edition only)
 "Route 66" (Bobby Troup) – 2:57
 "The Shadow of Your Smile" (Johnny Mandel, Paul Francis Webster) – 4:28
 "Here's to Life" (Artie Butler, Phyllis Molinary) – 5:32
 "It's Too Soon to Know" (Deborah Chessler) – 2:42
 "Caroline, No" (Brian Wilson, Tony Asher) – 4:00
 "The Look of Love" (Burt Bacharach, Hal David) – 3:33
 "I'm Getting Old Before My Time" (Una Mae Carlisle) – 3:43
 "Worried Mind" (Ted Daffan, Jimmie H. Davis) – 2:48 (Deluxe Edition only)
 "I Wanna Be Around" (Johnny Mercer, Sadie Vimmerstedt) – 2:19 (Deluxe Edition only)
 "Same Girl" (Randy Newman) – 3:05
 "After Hours" (Glenn Frey, Jack Tempchin) – 4:18

Personnel 
 Glenn Frey – vocals, backing vocals (1, 6)
 Richard F.W. Davis – keyboards (1, 2, 5, 6, 11), horns (8), horn arrangements (9)
 Michael Thompson – acoustic piano, guitars (1, 4), organ (2), electric guitar (3, 6), vibraphone (4), electric piano (5, 7), accordion (7), acoustic guitar (7), trombone (7)
 Steuart Smith – electric guitar (2, 9, 11), acoustic guitar (8)
 Greg Leisz – steel guitar (3, 7)
 Mike Harlow – baritone guitar (7)
 Reggie McBride – bass (1-6, 9, 10, 11)
 Jonathan Clark – electric upright bass (8)
 Scott Crago – drums (1-4, 6-9, 11)
 Lenny Castro – congas (3, 8), bongos (7), percussion (8)
 Stephanie O'Keefe – French horn (2, 5, 6)
 Tom Evans – tenor saxophone (4), flute (5), clarinet (6, 7, 11), English horn (7, 11), tenor sax solo (9)
 Al Garth – recorder (7)
 Greg Smith – alto saxophone (9)
 Chris Mostert – tenor saxophone (9)
 Bill Armstrong – flugelhorn (8)
 Nick Lane – trombone (9)
 Les Lovitt – trumpet (9)
 Mitch Manker – trumpet solo (9)

Orchestra
 Alan Broadbent – orchestral arrangements and conductor, string arrangements (5)
 Richard Davis – string arrangements (5)
 Marcy Vaj – contractor 
 Kevin Axt and Putter Smith – bass 
 Jodi Burnett, Ira Glansbeek, Paula Hochhalter, Timothy Loo and Elizabeth Wright – cello 
 Brett Banducci, Robert Berg, Suzanna Giordano Gignac, Margot MacLaine and Novi Novog – viola
 Jackie Brand, Chung Mei Chang, Mario DeLeon, Michael Ferril, Eric Gorfain, Scott Hosfeld, Dimitrie Leivici, Maria Newman, Neli Nikolaeva, Alyssa Park, Cameron Patrick, Susan Rishik, Anatoly Rosinski, Olivia Tsui, Marcy Vaj, Deb Vukovitz, Amy Wickman, Margaret Wooten and Adriana Zoppo – violin

Production 
 Richard F.W. Davis – producer, arrangements, engineer, digital engineer 
 Glenn Frey – producer, arrangements 
 Michael Thompson – producer, arrangements 
 Mike Harlow – engineer 
 Elliot Scheiner – orchestra recording, mixing 
 Dan Garcia – orchestra recording assistant 
 Schnee Studios (North Hollywood, California) – orchestra recording location 
 Bob Ludwig – mastering at Gateway Mastering (Portland, Maine)
 Ivy Skoff – production coordinator 
 Jeri Heiden for SMOG Design, Inc. – art direction 
 Nick Steinhardt for SMOG Design, Inc. – design 
 Jim Sheldon – photography 
 Autumn de Wilde – photography 
 Irving Azoff – management

References

Glenn Frey albums
2012 albums
Universal Music Group albums
Covers albums
Traditional pop albums